Bill Nye the Science Guy is an American science education television program created by Bill Nye, James McKenna, and Erren Gottlieb, with Nye starring as a fictionalized version of himself. It was produced by television station KCTS and McKenna/Gottlieb Producers and distributed by Buena Vista Television with substantial financing from the National Science Foundation. The show aired in syndication from September 10, 1993, to February 5, 1999, over the course of six seasons and 100 episodes; beginning in season 2, a concurrent run was added on PBS from October 10, 1994, to September 3, 1999, with the show's first run remaining in syndication. After the show's first run was completed, Nye continued to portray the Science Guy character for a number of short interstitial segments for the cable television channel Noggin, which aired during rebroadcasts of Bill Nye the Science Guy. A video game based on the series was released in 1996, and a subsequent television show for adults, Bill Nye Saves the World, was broadcast two decades later.

Known for its quirky humor and rapid-fire MTV-style pacing, the show won critical acclaim and was nominated for 23 Emmy Awards, winning 19. Studies also found that people that viewed Bill Nye regularly were better able to generate explanations and extensions of scientific ideas than non-viewers.

Format
Nye portrays a hyper-kinetic, tall, and slender scientist wearing a blue lab coat and a bow-tie. He combines the serious science of everyday things with fast-paced action and humor. Each half-hour show begins with a cold open, where Nye introduces the episode's theme, which leads into an opening credit sequence, and featuring Nye in a computer animated scientific world, along with his head spinning, radio frequencies, and plastic toy dinosaurs flying. In later seasons, the theme song was cut short by a static screen. After the opening credits, announcer Pat Cashman says "Brought to you by...", in which a product name is related to the episode's theme. Nye walks onto the set, which is called "Nye Laboratories", filled with scientific visuals including many "of science" contraptions announced dramatically, relevant to the theme of the episode. Science-related TV and movie parodies configure the facts of the episode's theme, along with parodies of TV commercials. The show has featured many guest appearances. Each episode features Nye visiting many places relating to the episode's theme, showing interviews of people talking about their work and other contributions. At the end of each episode, Nye thanks the viewers for watching, before explaining in a clever description of a theme's activity. The closing credits roll over bloopers from the episode.

Segments
Way Cool Scientist: An expert discusses the fact of the episode's theme.
Consider the Following: Nye discusses a certain aspect of the episode's theme.
Nifty Home Experiment: A viewer demonstrates a simple home experiment.
Try This: A viewer presents a simple demonstration.
Hey! Look at This: An expert gives a closer look into the episode's theme.
Check it Out: A viewer affects their environmental issues.
Clever Science Trick: A viewer demonstrates a simple science trick.
The Jackie Smazz Show: Pat Cashman performs an act as a talk show-style host named Jackie Smazz.
Great Moments in Science: Cashman narrates a historical event in science.
Great Moments in Communication: Cashman narrates a historical event in communication.
Pet Rock Theater: Animated pet rocks perform an act.
Better Eating Through Kitchen Chemistry: Bill Nye portrays Vivian Cupcake demonstrating scientific recipes.
Richie, Eat Your Crust: Nye and the Family Crust perform an act themed around telling the title boy to "eat your crust".
Did You Know That...: An interesting factoid is presented.
Luna Van Dyke, Private Eye: Private eye Luna Van Dyke focuses on a story.
Mind Your Manners with Billy Quan A martial arts-themed episode parody.
Soundtrack of Science: A science-themed song parody.

History

Origins and creation
Bill Nye was originally an engineer for the 747 airliner at Boeing, having moved to Seattle in 1977 after he was accepted for the position. Nye began to perform stand-up comedy in his spare time after he entered and won a Steve Martin lookalike contest at a comedy club, which led to him meeting fellow comedians Ross Shafer and John Keister. Nye eventually left Boeing in 1985 to join Shafer and Keister in writing and performing for Almost Live!, a then-fledgling sketch comedy television show produced by local NBC affiliate KING-TV. During his tenure on the show, Nye began cultivating a science-explaining TV persona; the first instance of the persona occurred in 1985 when Nye called Shafer on-air to correct his pronunciation of the word "gigawatt", to which Shafer retorted, "Who do you think you are – Bill Nye the Science Guy?" As a result, Nye was subsequently asked to give scientific answers to the show's call-in questions. His persona's first on-air appearance, as it is contemporarily known, occurred on January 10, 1987, by circumstance when the primary guest for that night's performance of Almost Live! called in to cancel their appearance; with no backup guest planned to fill the resulting empty time, the show's writers elected to have Nye demonstrate the household uses of liquid nitrogen. During the demonstration, Nye submerged an onion in liquid nitrogen and proceeded to shatter it, receiving acclaim from the studio audience.

As Nye produced more demonstrations for Almost Live!, he began to develop the idea of a show featuring his "Science Guy" persona; KING-TV declined his proposal, though he eventually received assistance from station alumni James McKenna and Erren Gottlieb. Together, the group pitched the show as Watch Mr. Wizard meets Pee-wee's Playhouse, though the latter part was later replaced with MTV after the arrest of actor Paul Reubens for indecent exposure in 1991. Their pitch lasted for four years, being declined by Fox and other networks over various concerns, until they convinced Elizabeth Brock of local PBS member station KCTS-TV to take a chance on the idea. KCTS-TV commissioned a pilot for Bill Nye the Science Guy, which aired on April 14, 1993, on the station itself before airing on PBS stations nationwide for the rest of the month. Nye successfully obtained underwriting from the National Science Foundation and the U.S. Department of Energy. Nye's program became part of a package of syndicated series that local stations could schedule to fulfill Children's Television Act requirements; because of this, Bill Nye the Science Guy became the first program to run concurrently on both public and commercial stations.

Theme song
The Bill Nye the Science Guy theme song was written by songwriter (and former math teacher) Mike Greene. It was inspired by Danny Elfman and Oingo Boingo, when composing the theme, and used his voice for singing the "Bill Nye the Science Guy" refrain. It consisted of Pat Cashman saying the show's title in a distorted male voice, and the word "Bill" is repeated throughout as a percussive shout. An electric guitar was used during the theme song, followed by a female voice saying "Science rules!" (with Bill lip-syncing), "Inertia is a property of matter", and "T-minus seven seconds".

When Greene was enlisted to write the theme song, the show's producers requested that the song "not sound like a kid's show"; the final result was accordingly uncommon for the time. "I used my voice for the first demo to send to the producers, Jim and Erren," he said. "After they approved it, I hired singers because I wanted to make it better. I hired a guy to sing it who sounded pretty cool. He had like a rock‑and‑roll kind of voice, so it sounded pretty slick. Then as another option, I hired a girl to sing it to give it a bit more R&B kind of sound. Then I sent those versions to Jim and Erren, and they said, 'Why have you got them on it? We want your voice. It’s funnier.' I thought, 'My voice is funnier??? Good thing I’m not touchy about my singing!' So we kept my voice on there."

Set to a house beat, Greene enlisted rappers to repeat the word "Bill!" as a percussive shout, deliberately imitating the shouting featured in House of Pain's 1992 song "Jump Around". "I can't name them, because it was against their contract to do outside things without permission from their record company," Greene noted. "It was kinda funny, because they were in my studio one day to record a song. I was working on the Nye theme as they walked in and I told them, 'Hey, do me a favor and go in the booth and chant 'Bill, Bill, Bill' over and over again.' They had no idea what it was for, but they're cool, so they did. It sounded great, so that's the version we kept. The show didn't air until a year later, so it wasn't until then that they understood what this was really for."

Production
The show was created in 1992 by Bill Nye, James McKenna and Erren Gottlieb, produced by McKenna/Gottlieb Producers, Inc, in partnership with KCTS in Seattle. The following year, the production companies entered a distribution agreement with Buena Vista Television, a subsidiary of Disney. As part of the agreement, the profits of the show were split between Disney and the production team, with Disney owning full distribution rights across broadcasting, home video, and digital streaming. McKenna and Gottlieb all met while McKenna was a producer on Almost Live!, a Seattle-based comedy show.

The announcer for the program was Pat Cashman, whom Nye knew from his time on Almost Live!.

Before his show launched, Nye had previously worked alongside Christopher Lloyd in Back to the Future: The Animated Series, where he played Doc Brown's assistant and demonstrated several experiments.

The show has been likened to the next-generation version of Watch Mr. Wizard. The show ran about the same time as and covered similar topics to Beakman's World, in fact sharing one crew member, editor/writer/director Michael Gross.

The show was primarily funded by the National Science Foundation, the Corporation for Public Broadcasting and the annual financial support from the viewers/stations of the PBS network. Other funding sponsors included Ore Ida, The Boeing Company (which Nye worked for until 1986, Boeing was also based in Seattle until 2001 when it relocated its corporate headquarters to Chicago, Illinois), and Intel. The Syndicated airings were credited as "Produced in Association with the National Science Foundation", while the PBS airings changed it to "Produced in Association with Walt Disney Television".

The show began with a 26-episode order for the 1993–1994 Season. After its initial success, it was renewed for a second 26-episode order for the 1994–1995 Season, followed by 13 for the 1995–1996 Season. Lastly, it was renewed for two more years, bringing the final episode total to 100. The final episode aired in 1999, well after production ended in 1997.

Despite Disney's association and ownership with the show, it has never aired on any network owned by Walt Disney Television in the US (such as Disney Channel and the American Broadcasting Company, known as simply ABC, which Disney did not acquire until 1996, three years after the show premiered.)

Noggin shorts

In September 1999, Bill Nye signed a multi-year deal to develop and star in original programs for Noggin, a cable channel co-owned by Nickelodeon and the Children's Television Workshop. In addition to producing the new content, Noggin acquired all 100 episodes of Bill Nye the Science Guy; this made it the first-ever program acquisition by the channel. Noggin and Nye chose not to develop new episodes of the show, and instead created original shorts featuring Nye, in character and costume from Bill Nye the Science Guy. In the shorts, Nye's "Science Guy" persona worked as the "head sparkologist" of Noggin, and he tried to find out what topics sparked viewers' imaginations. Bill Nye told Multichannel News that he was interested in creating multiple original shows for Noggin, including a math-based series and one "showing kids how to exercise good judgment."

Impact
In conjunction with the production of Bill Nye the Science Guy, KCTS-TV conducted several research studies that evaluated how effective the program was as an educational tool. In one study, it was found that viewers of the program made more observations and sophisticated classifications than non-viewers. In surveys of elementary students who watched the program, most children concluded that Nye made "kids like science more". When surveyed whether Nye was a scientist or actor and comedian, most students asserted he was a scientist, though many said both. Students also described Nye almost equally as both "funny" and "smart", and believed he was a "source of good information."

Episodes

Series overview
NOTE: The Production Codes were taken from the United States Copyright Office. Airdates were taken from the Newspaper Archives. The Sioux City, Iowa NBC affiliate of KTIV is an example of a station that carried the show in Syndication.

Pilot (1993)

Season 1 (1993–94)

Season 2 (1994–95)

Season 3 (1995)

Season 4 (1996–97)

Season 5 (1997–98)

Season 6 (1998–99)

Awards
During its run, Bill Nye the Science Guy was nominated for 23 Emmy Awards, winning nineteen.

Daytime Emmy Awards
 1996 – Outstanding Writing in a Children's Series – Erren Gottlieb, Bill Nye, James McKenna, Scott Schaefer, Adam Gross and Seth Gross
 1996 – Outstanding Sound Editing – Michael McAuliffe, Sony Felberg, Vince Werner, Dave Howe, Ella Brackett, Thomas McGurk and Jim Wilson
 1997 – Outstanding Writing in a Children's Series – Kit Boss, Erren Gottlieb, Michael Gross, James McKenna, Bill Nye, Ian G. Saunders, Scott Schaefer, William Sleeth and Darrell Suto
 1997 – Outstanding Directing in a Children's Series – Darrell Suto, Michael Gross, Erren Gottlieb and James McKenna
 1997 – Outstanding Single Camera Editing – Darrell Suto, Michael Gross, Felicity Oram and John Reul
 1997 – Outstanding Sound Editing – Thomas McGurk, Michael McAuliffe, Sony Felberg, Vince Werner, and Dave Howe
 1998 – Outstanding Writing in a Children's Series – Erren Gottlieb, James McKenna, Bill Nye, Michael Gross, Darrell Suto, Scott Schaefer, Kit Boss, Lynn Brunelle, Michael Palleschi, Ian G. Saunders and Simon Griffith (Tied with Sesame Street)
 1998 – Outstanding Performer in a Children's Series – Bill Nye
 1998 – Outstanding Single Camera Editing – Darrell Suto, Michael Gross, Felicity Oram and John Reul
 1998 – Outstanding Sound Editing – Dave Howe, Thomas McGurk and Michael McAuliffe
 1998 – Outstanding Sound Mixing – Dave Howe, Thomas McGurk, Michael McAuliffe, Bob O'Hern, Resti Bagcal and Marion Smith
 1999 – Outstanding Children's Series – Erren Gottlieb, James McKenna, Elizabeth Brock, Jamie Hammond, Hamilton McCulloch and Bill Nye
 1999 – Outstanding Directing in a Children's Series – Michael Gross and Darrell Suto
 1999 – Outstanding Single Camera Editing – Felicity Oram, John Reul, Michael Gross and Darrell Suto
 1999 – Outstanding Sound Editing – Dave Howe, Thomas McGurk and Michael McAuliffe
 2000 – Outstanding Writing in a Children's Series – Bill Nye, Michael Gross, Darrell Suto, Ian G. Saunders, Michael Palleschi, Lynn Brunelle and Mike Greene
 2000 – Outstanding Children's Series – James McKenna, Erren Gottlieb, Elizabeth Brock, Jamie Hammond and Bill Nye
 2000 – Outstanding Sound Editing – Dave Howe, Michael McAuliffe and Thomas McGurk
 2000 – Outstanding Sound Mixing – Dave Howe, Michael McAuliffe, Thomas McGurk, Myron Partman and Resti Bagcal (Tied with Honey, I Shrunk the Kids: The TV Show and Bear in the Big Blue House)

Home media
Walt Disney Studios Home Entertainment released the series in its entirety on DVD, as part of the series' 20th anniversary. In the United Kingdom, it was distributed on VHS by ViewTech, Bristol. In 1994 and 1995, Walt Disney Home Video released five volumes of Bill Nye the Science Guy, such as "The Human Body: The Inside Scoop", "Powerful Forces: All Pumped Up", "Dinosaurs: Those Big Boneheads", "Reptiles & Insects: Leapin' Lizards", and "Outer Space: Way Out There". All five volumes were released on VHS, containing two episodes. As of May 2017, the 1996 episode "Probability" is edited from its original airing, with a segment removed featuring a cast member saying there are only two genders. Netflix denied allegations they edited it (their new series Bill Nye Saves the World features Nye stating gender is on a spectrum) saying "It was delivered to us that way by Buena Vista TV." A set of 31 episodes is also available for purchase on the iTunes Store, though they have been split into two separate volumes; one containing 14 episodes and the other containing 17 episodes.

Despite Disney's involvement in the series, the series has not been available on Disney+ due to a dispute with Nye over revenue sharing.

Video game
A computer game based on the series, titled Bill Nye: The Science Guy - Stop the Rock!, was released in 1996 for Windows and Macintosh by Pacific Interactive.

See also
 Bill Nye Saves the World
 Stuff Happens
 The Eyes of Nye
 Carl Sagan
 Universe of Energy – an attraction at Walt Disney World's Epcot starring Bill Nye.
 Bill Nye–Ken Ham debate

Notes

References

External links

 Bill Nye, The Science Lab Official Site
 
 Episode Review "The Sun", Deep Yellow's "My Favorite Star".
 Video (02:47) – Epic Rap Battles of History: Sir Isaac Newton vs Bill Nye.
  results.
 Human Timeline (Interactive) – Smithsonian, National Museum of Natural History (August 2016).

Science Guy, The
1993 American television series debuts
1999 American television series endings
1990s American children's comedy television series
1990s American sketch comedy television series
American children's education television series
American television series with live action and animation
Children's sketch comedy
Emmy Award-winning programs
English-language television shows
PBS Kids shows
PBS original programming
Disney Channel original programming
Science education television series
Television series by Disney
Television shows filmed in Washington (state)
Mass media in Seattle